Ultimate Collectors (2002–2003) was a show on Home and Garden Television (HGTV) for people who love to collect, or are fascinated by those who do. Each episode introduces viewers to the real "wow" collections and collectors. Some of the collections are valuable and some are not, but bet your bottom dollar, they're priceless to the people collecting them.

Cast 
Host: Kevin Flynn

Episodes

First Season 
Episode UTC-101: The Wizard of Oz, Surfboards, Shakers, Pinball Machines
Episode UTC-102: Spider-Man, Smiley Faces, Packards, Kitchen Collectibles
Episode UTC-103: Hot Wheels, Barbie, Presidential Autographs, Carousel Horses
Episode UTC-104: M&Ms, Corvettes, Auto Instruments
Episode UTC-105: Star Wars, Flamingos, Typewriters, James Bond
Episode UTC-106: Statue of Liberty, Transferware, Buttons, Matchbooks
Episode UTC-107: Firefighter Memorabilia, G.I. Joes, Cowboy Kitsch
Episode UTC-108: Rock 'n' Roll, Toys, Perfume Bottles, Bananas
Episode UTC-109: Marbles, Head Vases, Everything Purple and Vintage Drums
Episode UTC-110: Peanuts Cartoons, Disney Pins, Clown Keepsakes
Episode UTC-111: Normandy Memorabilia, Vacuum Cleaners and Board Games
Episode UTC-112: Elvis, Reamers, Cats and Miniature Pianos
Episode UTC-113: B-Movie Memorabilia, Garfield and Tiki Collectibles

Second Season 
Episode UTC-201: Vintage Diners, Trains, Pixieware and Sewing Machines
Episode UTC-202: Mr. Peanut, Slot Machines, Banks and Old Photography
Episode UTC-203: Beatles, Mini Souvenir Buildings and Wee Forest Folk
Episode UTC-204: Monkees Memorabilia, Yo-Yos, Hats and Teddy Bears
Episode UTC-205: Marilyn Monroe, Automobilia, Tins and Pincushions
Episode UTC-206: Brooklyn Dodgers Memorabilia, Cartoon Glasses, Coca-Cola Memorabilia and Mouse Pads
Episode UTC-207: Raggedy Ann, American Flags, Art Glass and Little Golden Books
Episode UTC-208: Planet of the Apes and The Simpsons Memorabilia, Sock Monkeys and Gumball Machines
Episode UTC-209: Antique Tools, Lassie Memorabilia, Lunchboxes and Antique Radios
Episode UTC-210: Charlie's Angels Memorabilia, Puzzles, Coins and Cow Figurines
Episode UTC-211: Pez Dispensers, Superman Memorabilia, Pandas and Tim Burton Movie Memorabilia
Episode UTC-212: TV Costumes, Mighty Mouse, Smurfs and Antiques of the Future
Episode UTC-213: Batman Memorabilia, Legos, Advertising Icons and Fountain Pens

Footnotes

External links 
Ultimate Collectors' Home Page
HGTV.com

2002 American television series debuts
2003 American television series endings
2000s American reality television series
HGTV original programming